{{DISPLAYTITLE:C4H10N2}}
The molecular formula C4H10N2 may refer to:

 Diazinane
 Piperazine
 Hexahydropyrimidine
 Hexahydropyridazine
 Azoethane
 Diaminocyclobutanes

Molecular formulas